Samuel Swift ( – 8 February 1718) was an English Tory politician, MP for Worcester 1693–1694 and 1695–1718.

Swift was the son of William Swift, a Worcester merchant, and his wife Martha Beauchamp.

On 25 November 1679, Swift married Sarah Shrewing, daughter of Thomas Shrewing of Worcester.

He pursued a career in local Worcester politics, serving on the council from 1677, as Chamberlain 1678–79, Sheriff 1683–84, Mayor 1684–85 and October–November 1688, alderman 1689, and High Sheriff of Worcestershire 1692–93.

In 1693 Sir John Somers, having been appointed Lord Keeper of the Great Seal, vacated his seat at Worcester. A bitter by-election ensued, contested by the Tory Swift and the Whig Charles Cocks, Somers' brother-in-law. Swift was elected by 682 votes to 575, but Cocks petitioned the House of Commons to overturn the result on the grounds of illegal voting practices. The petition was upheld on 7 February 1694, and Swift was unseated, prompting outrage among the citizens of Worcester.

In 1695 Cocks stood at Droitwich, and Swift was re-elected at Worcester. He held the seat until his death.

In 1696–97, during an enquiry into the Royal Mint, Swift was accused of involvement in coin clipping, a treasonable offence. The House of Commons voted these allegations groundless and frivolous on 8 April 1697.

He died on 8 February 1718.

References

1650s births
1718 deaths
Tory MPs (pre-1834)
English MPs 1690–1695
English MPs 1695–1698
English MPs 1698–1700
English MPs 1701–1702
English MPs 1705–1707
British MPs 1707–1708
British MPs 1708–1710
British MPs 1710–1713
British MPs 1713–1715
British MPs 1715–1722
High Sheriffs of Worcestershire